Robert Austin may refer to:
Robert Austin (explorer) (1825–1905), explorer of Australia
Robert Austin (artist) (1895–1973), British artist and printmaker
Robert Austin (Oxford University cricketer) (1871–1958), English cricketer
Robert Austin (divine) (1592/93–?), Puritan theologian and divine
Robert Austin (judge), judge of the Supreme Court of New South Wales
Robert Austin (trade unionist) (1826–1891), British trade unionist
Robert Hamilton Austin (born 1946), American physicist
Robert D. Austin (born 1962), innovation and technology management researcher and professor

See also
Rob Austin (born 1981), English racing driver
Bobby Austin (disambiguation)
Robert Austen (disambiguation)